Rebecca Smyth (née Trethowan born 8 February 1985) is a former Australian rugby union player. She represented  at the 2010 Rugby World Cup, they finished in third place. She also competed at the 2006 and 2014 Rugby World Cup's.

Smyth was named in a 22-player squad that toured New Zealand in October 2007. In 2008, Smyth toured New Zealand again with the Wallaroos for a Two-Test series.

References

1985 births
Living people
Australia women's international rugby union players
Australian female rugby union players
Rugby union flankers
20th-century Australian women
21st-century Australian women